Vasilovtsi (also transliterated Vasilovci, Vasilevtsi or Wassilowzi) is a village in western Bulgaria, located in the Dragoman Municipality of the Sofia Province.

References

Villages in Sofia Province